Diana, Lady Mosley (née Mitford; 17 June 191011 August 2003) was a British aristocrat, fascist, writer and editor. She was one of the Mitford sisters and eventually, the wife of Oswald Mosley, leader of the British Union of Fascists.

Initially married to Bryan Guinness, heir to the barony of Moyne, with whom she was part of the Bright Young Things social group of young Bohemian socialites in 1920s London, her marriage ended in divorce as she was pursuing a relationship with Oswald Mosley. In 1936, she married Mosley at the home of the propaganda minister for Nazi Germany, Joseph Goebbels, with Adolf Hitler as guest of honour. Her involvement with fascist political causes resulted in three years' internment during the Second World War, when Britain was at war with the fascist regime of Nazi Germany. She later moved to Paris and enjoyed some success as a writer. In the 1950s, she contributed diaries to Tatler and edited the magazine The European. In 1977, she published her autobiography, A Life of Contrasts, and two more biographies in the 1980s.

Mosley's 1989 appearance on BBC Radio 4's Desert Island Discs was controversial due to her Holocaust denial and admiration of Hitler. She was also a regular book reviewer for Books and Bookmen and later at The Evening Standard in the 1990s. A family friend, James Lees-Milne, wrote of her beauty, "She was the nearest thing to Botticelli's Venus that I have ever seen". She was described as "unrepentant" about her previous political associations by obituary writers such as the historian Andrew Roberts.

Early life
Diana Mitford was the fourth child and third daughter of David Freeman-Mitford, 2nd Baron Redesdale (1878–1958), and his wife Sydney (1880–1963). She was a first cousin of Clementine Churchill, second cousin of Sir Angus Ogilvy, and first cousin, twice removed, of Bertrand Russell. She was raised in the country estate of Batsford Park, Gloucestershire, then from the age of 10 at the family home, Asthall Manor in Oxfordshire, and later at Swinbrook House, a home her father had built in the nearby village of Swinbrook.

She was educated at home by a series of governesses, except for a six-month period in 1926, when she was sent to a day school in Paris. In childhood, her younger sisters Jessica Mitford ("Decca") and Deborah ("Debo", later the Duchess of Devonshire), were particularly devoted to her. At the age of 18, shortly after her presentation at Court, she became secretly engaged to Bryan Walter Guinness.

Marriages

Guinness, an Irish aristocrat, writer and brewing heir, would inherit the barony of Moyne. Diana's parents were opposed to the engagement but in time were persuaded; Sydney was particularly uneasy at the thought of two such young people having possession of such a large fortune, but she was eventually convinced Bryan was a suitable husband. They married on 30 January 1929; her sisters Jessica and Deborah were too ill to attend the ceremony. The couple had an income of £20,000 a year, an estate at Biddesden in Wiltshire, and houses in London and Dublin. They were well known for hosting aristocratic society events involving the Bright Young People. The writer Evelyn Waugh exclaimed that her beauty "ran through the room like a peal of bells", and he dedicated the novel Vile Bodies to her. Her portrait was painted by Augustus John, Pavel Tchelitchew and Henry Lamb.  She was one of a series of society beauties photographed as classical figures by Madame Yevonde. The couple had two sons, Jonathan (b. 1930) and Desmond (1931–2020).

In February 1932, Diana met Sir Oswald Mosley at a garden party at the home of the society hostess Emerald Cunard. He soon became leader of the newly formed British Union of Fascists and Diana became his lover; Mosley was then married to Lady Cynthia Mosley, a daughter of Lord Curzon, a former Viceroy of India, and his first wife, the American mercantile heiress Mary Victoria Leiter. Diana left her husband, "moving with a skeleton staff of nanny, cook, house-parlourmaid and lady's maid to a house at 2 Eaton Square, round the corner from Mosley's flat", but Sir Oswald would not leave his wife. Quite suddenly, Cynthia died in 1933 of peritonitis. Mosley was devastated by the death of his wife, but later started an affair with her younger sister, Lady Alexandra Metcalfe.

Diana's parents did not approve of her decision to leave Guinness for Mosley and she was briefly estranged from most of her family. Her affair and eventual marriage to Mosley also strained relationships with her sisters. Initially, Jessica and Deborah were not permitted to see Diana as she was "living in sin" with Mosley in London. Deborah eventually came to know Mosley and ended up liking him very much. Jessica despised Mosley's beliefs and became permanently estranged from Diana after the late 1930s. Pam and her husband Derek Jackson got along well with Mosley. Nancy never liked Mosley and, like Jessica, despised his political beliefs, but was able to learn to tolerate him for the sake of her relationship with Diana. Nancy wrote the novel Wigs on the Green, which satirised Mosley and his beliefs. After it was published in 1935, relations between the sisters became strained to non-existent and it was not until the mid-1940s that they were able to get back to being close again.

The couple rented Wootton Lodge, a country house in Staffordshire which Diana had intended to buy. She furnished much of her new home with much of the Swinbrook furniture that her father was selling. The Mosleys lived at Wootton Lodge along with their children from 1936 to 1939.

Nazi Germany 
In 1934, Diana visited Germany with her then 19-year-old sister Unity. While there, they attended the first Nuremberg rally after the Nazi rise to power. A friend of Hitler's, Unity introduced Diana to him in March 1935. They returned for the second rally later that year and were entertained as his guests at the 1935 rally. In 1936, he provided a Mercedes-Benz to chauffeur Diana to the Berlin Olympic games. She became well acquainted with Winifred Wagner and Magda Goebbels.

Diana and Oswald secretly married on 6 October 1936 in the drawing room of Nazi propaganda chief Joseph Goebbels. Adolf Hitler, Robert Gordon-Canning and Bill Allen were in attendance. The marriage was kept secret until the birth of their first child in 1938. In August 1939, Hitler told Diana over lunch that war was inevitable.

Mosley and Diana had two sons: (Oswald) Alexander Mosley (born 26 November 1938) and Max Rufus Mosley (13 April 1940 – 23 May 2021), president of the Fédération Internationale de l'Automobile (FIA) for 16 years. Hitler presented the couple with a silver framed picture of himself. The Mosleys were interned during much of World War II, under Defence Regulation 18B along with other British fascists including Norah Elam.

MI5 documents released in 2002 described Lady Mosley and her political leanings. "Diana Mosley, wife of Sir Oswald Mosley, is reported on the 'best authority', that of her family and intimate circle, to be a public danger at the present time. Is said to be far cleverer and more dangerous than her husband and will stick at nothing to achieve her ambitions. She is wildly ambitious." On 29 June 1940, eleven weeks after the birth of her fourth son, Max, Diana was arrested (hastily stuffing Hitler's photograph under Max's cot mattress when the police came to arrest her) and taken to a cell in F Block in London's Holloway Prison for women. She and her husband were held without charge or trial under the provisions of 18B, on the advice of MI5. The couple were initially held separately but, after personal intervention by Churchill, in December 1941, Mosley and two other 18B husbands (one of them Mosley's friend Captain H.W. Luttman-Johnson) were permitted to join their wives at Holloway. After more than three years' imprisonment, they were both released in November 1943 on the grounds of Mosley's ill health; they were placed under house arrest until the end of the war and were denied passports until 1949.

Lady Mosley's prison time failed to disturb her approach to life; she remarked in her later years that she felt better treated than earlier prisoners.

According to an anecdote in her The Daily Telegraph obituary, Evelyn Waugh saw Lady Mosley wear a diamond swastika brooch among her jewels as she left prison.

Post-war
After the war ended, the couple kept homes in Ireland, with apartments in London and Paris. Their recently renovated Clonfert home, a former Bishop's palace, burned down in an accidental fire. In her memoirs, Diana blamed her cook, writing that the fire could have been extinguished had it not been for the cook who ran back to her room to retrieve her possessions and in doing so delayed efforts to control the fire. Following this, they moved to a home near Fermoy, County Cork, later settling permanently in France, at the Temple de la Gloire, a Palladian temple in Orsay, southwest of Paris, in 1950 (built in 1801 to honour the French victory of December 1800 at Hohenlinden, near Munich). Gaston and Bettina Bergery had told the Mosleys that the property was on the market. They were neighbours of the Duke and Duchess of Windsor, who lived in the neighbouring town Gif-sur-Yvette, and soon became their close friends.

Once again they became known for entertaining, but were barred from all functions at the British Embassy. During their time in France, the Mosleys quietly went through another marriage ceremony; Hitler had safeguarded their original marriage licence, and it was never found after the war. During this period, Mosley was unfaithful to Diana, but she found for the most part that she was able to learn to keep herself from getting too upset regarding his adulterous habits. She told an interviewer: "I think if you're going to mind infidelity, you better call it a day as far as marriage goes. Because who has ever remained faithful? I mean, they don't. There's passion and that's it." Diana was also a lifelong supporter of the British Union of Fascists (BUF), and its postwar successor the Union Movement.

At times, she was vague when discussing her loyalties to Britain, her strong belief in fascism, and her attitude to Jews. In her 1977 autobiography A Life of Contrasts, she wrote, "I didn't love Hitler any more than I did Winston [Churchill]. I can't regret it, it was so interesting." In her final interviews with Duncan Fallowell in 2002, she responded that her reaction to the newsreels of death camps was "Well, of course, horror. Utter horror. Exactly the same probably as your reactions." However, when asked about having revulsion against Hitler for this, she said that "I had a complete revulsion against the people who did it but I could never efface from my memory the man I had actually experienced before the war. A very complicated feeling. I can't really relate those two things to each other. I know I'm not supposed to say that but I just have to." At other times, however, she behaved so as to suggest intense anti-semitic attitudes; the journalist Paul Callan remembered mentioning that he was Jewish while interviewing her husband in Diana's presence. According to Callan, "I mentioned, just in the course of conversation, that I was Jewish—at which Lady Mosley went ashen, snapped a crimson nail and left the room ... No explanation was given but she would later write to a friend: 'A nice, polite reporter came to interview Tom [as Mosley was known] but he turned out to be Jewish and was sitting there at our table. They are a very clever race and come in all shapes and sizes.'" Diana offered to entertain her teenage half-Jewish nephew, Benjamin Treuhaft, on a trip to France. The offer was refused by Benjamin's mother, Jessica, who remained estranged from Diana over the latter's political past. In a 2000 interview with The Guardian, Diana said that "Maybe instead they [European Jews] could have gone somewhere like Uganda: very empty and a lovely climate" (a reference to the Uganda Scheme proposed by Zionists in 1903).

Her appearance on the BBC Radio 4 programme Desert Island Discs with Sue Lawley in 1989 remains controversial due to Mosley's Holocaust denial and admiration of Hitler. Mosley told Lawley that she had not believed the extermination of Jews by Nazi Germany until "years" after the war, and that she thought the official death figure of six million Jewish victims was too high. The broadcast of this episode had to be rescheduled several times because it kept coinciding with Jewish holidays and prompted hundreds of complaints to the BBC. In 2016, a writer at the BBC described it as the most controversial of all Desert Island Discs episodes. Her choices of music to be played on Desert Island Discs were: Symphony No. 41 (Mozart), "Casta Diva" from Norma (Bellini), "Ode to Joy" (Beethoven), Die Walküre (Wagner), Liebestod (Wagner), "L'amour est un oiseau rebelle" from Carmen (Bizet), "A Whiter Shade of Pale" (Procol Harum) and Polonaise in F-sharp minor (Chopin).

Since their early twenties, Diana and her sister, Jessica only saw each other once, when they met for half an hour as their elder sister, Nancy, lay dying in Versailles. Diana was asked about her sister in 1996, "I quite honestly don't mind what Decca [Jessica] says or thinks," adding that "She means absolutely nothing to me at all. Not because she's a Communist but simply because she's a rather boring person, really."

In 1998, due to her advancing age, she moved out of the Temple de la Gloire and into an apartment in the 7th arrondissement of Paris. Temple de la Gloire was sold in 2000 for £1 million. Throughout much of her life, particularly after her years in prison, she was afflicted by regular bouts of migraines. In 1981, she underwent successful surgery to remove a brain tumour. She convalesced at Chatsworth House, the residence of her sister Deborah. In the early 1990s, she was also successfully treated for skin cancer. In later life, she also suffered from deafness.

Mosley attended the funeral of René de Chambrun, the son-in-law of Vichy France Prime Minister Pierre Laval, in 2002.

Writer

Mosley was shunned in the British media for a period after the war and the couple established their own publishing company, Euphorion Books, named after a character in Goethe's Faust. This allowed Mosley to publish and Diana was free to commission a cultural list. After his release from jail, Mosley declared the death of fascism. Diana initially translated Goethe's Faust. Other notable books published by Euphorion under her aegis included La Princesse de Clèves (translated by Nancy, 1950), Niki Lauda's memoirs (1985), and Hans-Ulrich Rudel's memoirs, Stuka Pilot. She also edited several of her husband's books.

While in France, Mosley edited the fascist cultural magazine The European for six years, and to this magazine she herself sometimes contributed material. She provided articles, book reviews, and regular diary entries. Many of her contributions were republished in 2008 in The Pursuit of Laughter. In 1965, she was commissioned to write the regular column "Letters from Paris" for Tatler. She reviewed autobiographical and biographical accounts as well as the occasional novel. Characteristically she would provide commentary of her own experiences and personal information of the subject of the book under discussion. She wrote regularly for Books and Bookmen. Her 1980 review of a biography on Magda Goebbels attracted attention from Christopher Hitchens. Hitchens objected to a passage where Mosley wrote: "Everyone knows the tragic end. As the Russians surrounded Berlin, the Goebbels painlessly killed their children and then themselves. The dead children were described by people who saw them as looking 'peacefully asleep'. Those who condemn this appalling, Masada-like deed must consider the alternative facing the distraught Magda." Hitchens insisted that the New Statesman issue an editorial condemning the Masada trope. In her eighties, Mosley became the lead reviewer for the London Evening Standard during A. N. Wilson's seven-year tenure as literary editor. In 1996, following Wilson's departure, his successor was asked by the new editor of the newspaper, Max Hastings to stop running Diana's reviews. Hastings is reported to have said that he did not want any more "bloody Lady Hitler" in the newspaper.

Mosley wrote the foreword and introduction of Nancy Mitford: A Memoir by Harold Acton. She produced her own two books of memoirs: A Life of Contrasts (1977, Hamish Hamilton), and Loved Ones (1985). The latter is a collection of pen portraits of close relatives and friends such as the writer Evelyn Waugh among others. In 1980, she released The Duchess of Windsor, a biography.

In 2007, letters between the Mitford sisters, including communications to and from Diana, were published in the compilation The Mitfords: Letters Between Six Sisters, edited by Charlotte Mosley. The Sunday Times journalist India Knight described her (and Unity) as "both chilling and gruesomely fascinating". A following collection consisting of her letters, articles, diaries and reviews was released as The Pursuit of Laughter in December 2008.

Death

Diana died in Paris in August 2003, aged 93. Her cause of death was given as complications related to a stroke she had suffered a week earlier, but reports later surfaced that she had been one of the many elderly fatalities of the heat wave of 2003 in mostly non-air-conditioned Paris. She was buried at St Mary's Churchyard, Swinbrook, Oxfordshire, alongside her sisters.

She was survived by her four sons: Desmond Guinness; Jonathan Guinness, 3rd Baron Moyne; Alexander and Max Mosley. Her stepson Nicholas Mosley was a novelist who also wrote a critical memoir of his father for which Diana reportedly never forgave him, despite their previously close relationship. A great-granddaughter, Jasmine Guinness, a great-niece, Stella Tennant, a granddaughter, Daphne Guinness, and a grandson, Tom Guinness, are models.

"I'm sure he [Hitler] was to blame for the extermination of the Jews," she told British journalist Andrew Roberts. "He was to blame for everything, and I say that as someone who approved of him." Roberts criticised Lady Mosley following her death on the pages of The Daily Telegraph (16 August 2003), declaring that she was an "unrepentant Nazi and effortlessly charming." He, in turn, was assailed three days later, in the same newspaper, by her son and granddaughter. A. N. Wilson wrote for the same newspaper and said that her public loyalty for Mosley and Hitler were disastrous mistakes. Wilson claimed that privately, Diana admitted that the Nazis were "really rather awful".

In literature 
Mosley inspired the protagonist of the 2018 novel After the Party by Cressida Connolly.

Bibliography
A Life of Contrasts (1977)
Loved Ones (1985)
The Duchess of Windsor (1980)
The Pursuit of Laughter (2008)
 Provided introduction and foreword to Nancy Mitford: A Memoir by Harold Acton (1975)
 Collection of letters between the six Mitford sisters: The Mitfords: Letters Between Six Sisters (2007)

Sources
 
 
  (French edition)

References

External links

 Diana Mosley: The MI5 View  - new files released from the National Archives shed new light on M15 surveillance of Mosley.
 The Official Nancy Mitford Website 

1910 births
2003 deaths
Antisemitism in the United Kingdom
British debutantes
English fascists
English expatriates in France
Daughters of barons
English biographers
English diarists
English memoirists
English non-fiction writers
English publishers (people)
English women writers
People detained under Defence Regulation 18B
People from Belgravia
English magazine editors
Diana
Guinness family
English socialites
British Union of Fascists politicians
Mosley family
Union Movement politicians
Women diarists
Wives of baronets
Women magazine editors
20th-century English businesspeople
20th-century diarists